Route 335 or Saint-Simon Road is a  long, north–south secondary highway in the southeastern portion of New Brunswick, Canada. 

The route's northern terminus in the community of Caraquet. The road travels south crossing the Saint-Simon River to the community of Saint-Simon. From there, the road crosses the Brideau River and ends in Evangeline without any other intersecting routes.

River crossings
Saint-Simon River
Brideau River

See also
List of New Brunswick provincial highways

References

335
335
Caraquet